Dorehami (lit. (friendly) get-together in Persian) is an Iranian Telecast currently directed by Mehran Modiri. It aired on cable network IRIB Nasim on Thursdays at 21:00 and Fridays and Saturdays at 23:00 (IST) from March 18 to October 1, 2016 and continue from November 4.
The show's first season finale aired on April 6, 2018, featuring Adel Ferdosipour as the guest.

Cast and characters

The first story
 Siamak Ansari as Peyman
 Shaghayegh Dehghan as Mehrnaz
 Elika Abdolrazzaghi as Homa
 Mohammad Naderi as Capitan
 Amir Mahdi Jule as Nader
 Mehran Ranjbar as Sepehr

The second story
 Siamak Ansari as Arsalan
 Mohammad Naderi as Janiyar "Johnny"
 Elika Abdolrazzaghi as Leyayul
 Ramin Nasernasir as Changiz Khan
 Leyla Irani as Darya
 Mehran Ranjbar as YoYo
 Amir Janani as LaLa
 Soroush Jamshidi as Gheymat

The third story
 Siamak Ansari as Arsalan
 Soroush Jamshidi as Gheymat
 Mahlagha Bagheri as Alieh "Annie"

The fourth story
 Soroush Jamshidi as Gheymat
 Sahar Valadbeigi as Shamsee (later left the show)

Episodes

2016

Awards and nominations

References

External links
 

2010s Iranian television series
2016 Iranian television series debuts
2018 Iranian television series endings
Iranian television series
Islamic Republic of Iran Broadcasting original programming
Persian-language television shows